William Allen Lyons (born April 26, 1958 in Alton, Illinois) is a former Major League Baseball infielder.

External links

Major League Baseball second basemen
St. Louis Cardinals players
Arkansas Travelers players
Louisville Redbirds players
Erie Cardinals players
Butte Copper Kings players
Southern Illinois Salukis baseball players
Springfield Redbirds players
Baseball players from Illinois
1958 births
Living people